Women in Technology is the second studio album by British recording artist White Town, released on 25 February 1997. The album is most known for the song "Your Woman" which was its only top 40 single. The song received much acclaim and reached #1 in the UK Singles Chart. A second single, released as a promo, was made of "Wanted" and failed to chart anywhere. The album's third single "Undressed" reached 57. The album was recorded entirely at Jyoti Mishra's home studio.

Background
In early 1997, Jyoti Mishra mailed out five copies of his extended play >Abort, Retry, Fail? to various radio stations. This caused the EP's lead track "Your Woman" to receive heavy rotation on stations, resulting in Mishra getting a deal with EMI. Through Chrysalis Records, a label owned by EMI, Mishra released the second White Town full-length Women In Technology, which produced three singles: the widely successful "Your Woman", the promo-only "Wanted", and "Undressed". The album was recorded and mixed to cassette tape using a Tascam 688 multitrack recorder.

Reception

Commercial
On the Billboard Heatseekers Album Chart dated March 15, 1997, Women in Technology debuted at number six. The album eventually reached the top 100 of the Billboard 200, thereby becoming ineligible for the Heatseekers chart, and ultimately peaked at number 84 on the Billboard 200 chart dated May 17, 1997.

Track listing

Personnel
Jyoti Mishra – production, vocals
Ann Pearson – vocals ("Thursday at the Blue Note", "Wanted", and "Once I Flew")
Robert Fleay – guitar ("Undressed", "A Week Next June", Going Nowhere Somehow", and "Once I Flew")

Charts

References 

1997 albums
White Town albums
Electronica albums by British artists